George Huntington (1850–1916) was a physician, the namesake of Huntington's disease.

George Huntington may also refer to:
George Huntington (Oneida County, NY) (1770–1841), New York politician from Oneida County, see 34th New York State Legislature
George Huntington (Steuben County, NY) (1796–1866), New York politician from Steuben County
George Sumner Huntington (1861–1927), physician
George Huntington (priest) (1825–1905), English clergyman

See also
George Huntingford (1748–1832), English bishop
George Huntingdon (disambiguation)
Huntington (disambiguation)
George Huntington Hartford (1833–1917), American businessman